

Overview & History

The Southern Connecticut Gas Company (SCG) is a natural gas distribution company that delivers natural gas and energy services to residential, commercial and industrial customers along or near the Long Island Sound shoreline. SCG is a subsidiary of Avangrid.

The company’s service territory includes the Connecticut cities of Bridgeport and New Haven, as well as the towns of Easton, Fairfield, Stratford, Trumbull, Westport and Weston in Fairfield County; Branford, East Haven, Guilford, Hamden, Madison, Milford, North Branford, North Haven, Orange, West Haven and Woodbridge in New Haven County; and Clinton, Westbrook, Essex and Old Saybrook in Middlesex County.

External links

Natural gas companies of the United States
Companies based in New Haven County, Connecticut
Orange, Connecticut
Energy companies established in 1847
Non-renewable resource companies established in 1847
1847 establishments in Connecticut